Tora Armida Dahl (9 June 1886 – 30 January 1982) was a Swedish teacher and novelist. She was married to literary critic Knut Jaensson. Among her novels is Fosterbarn from 1954. She was awarded the Dobloug Prize in 1975.

Personal life
Dahl was born in Stockholm on 9 June 1896, a daughter of architect Theodor Dahl and baker Emma Nilsdotter, and grew up with a foster mother in Nacka until the age of 11, when she moved to live with her mother. In 1914, she married , who initially could live off his inheritance from his father, and eventually became a literary critic. She died on 9 January 1982. Outside Vilan's school at the foot of the Danvikshem is a magnolia tree that Dahl donated in 1979 after she received the Magnolia Award from the Sofia Home Society. The magnolia was destroyed in 2010, but was replanted by the Nacka Hembygdsförening in 2011. Here, residents celebrate Magnolia Day in memory of the author at the end of April/May.

References

Further reading 
 

1886 births
1982 deaths
20th-century Swedish novelists
Dobloug Prize winners
Swedish women novelists
20th-century Swedish women writers
Swedish autobiographers